A War of Our Own is the fourth and final studio album by the Dutch progressive metal band Stream of Passion. Stream of Passion produced the album after leaving Napalm Records, financing it through crowdfunding website Indiegogo, and was their only album with the same line-up as its predecessor.

Background
Having signed to Napalm Records in 2008, Stream of Passion parted with the record label in 2012.  Speaking about the split, lead vocalist Marcela Bovio said: "I would rather not get very specific but let's say that we didn't think that we had the same ideas, and we didn't really think that they 'got' us that well".  Soon after, the band decided to fund their planned fourth album by way of fan donations, announcing a campaign through the crowdfunding website Indiegogo on July 16, 2013.  Regarding the decision to fund the album this way, bass player Johan van Stratum commented: "Times are changing, and so is the production of music and the way it is consumed. By taking things in their own hands, bands have more freedom and fans are enabled to support their favorites directly."  Donations to the campaign remained open for 3 months, with a target of raising €25,000 to produce the new album.  The campaign eventually generated almost twice the target goal, finishing at €43,881.  As a reward for their fans after surpassing their secondary goal of €40,000, the band recorded an acoustic set of songs from the upcoming album, exclusively for those who had contributed to the album's funding.
A lyric video for the song "The Curse" was released on March 7, 2014 and an official music video for "A War of Our Own" was released on April 16, 2014.

Track listing

Sources:

Charts

Personnel

Stream of Passion
Marcela Bovio – lead vocals, violin
Eric Hazebroek – guitar
Stephan Schultz – guitar
Johan van Stratum – bass
Jeffrey Revet – keyboards, synths
Martijn Peters – drums

Additional musicians
Ben Mathot – violin
David Faber – cello

Production
Joost van den Broek – production, mastering, mixing
Alexandra V Bach – cover art
Tim Tronckoe – photography

References

2014 albums
Stream of Passion albums